David Vyacheslavovich Mildzikhov (born 8 June 1994) is a Russian football player. He plays as a right back.

Club career
He made his debut in the Russian Second Division for FC Akademiya Tolyatti on 24 July 2012 in a game against FC Gornyak Uchaly.

He made his Russian Football National League debut for FC Baikal Irkutsk on 11 July 2015 in a game against FC Arsenal Tula.

References

External links
 

1994 births
Sportspeople from Vladikavkaz
Living people
Russian footballers
Association football midfielders
FC Volgar Astrakhan players
Russia under-21 international footballers
FC Yenisey Krasnoyarsk players
FC Zenit-2 Saint Petersburg players
FC Khimki players
FC Baikal Irkutsk players
FC Novokuznetsk players
FC Tom Tomsk players